The Grue is a torrent in north-west Italy, a right tributary of the Scrivia, whose  course lies entirely within the Province of Alessandria, Piedmont.

The river’s source is at Bocchetta del Barillaro, at an elevation of  close to the watershed with the Val Borbera. The river follows a tortuous course through the Ligurian Apennines, and between the hills of Tortona, before entering the Po plain at Viguzzolo.

The communes through whose territory the Grue passes are Dernice, Garbagna, Avolasca, Casasco, Montemarzino, Montegioco, Cerreto Grue, Sarezzano, Viguzzolo, Berzano di Tortona, Tortona, and Castelnuovo Scrivia.

References
The initial version of this article was a translation from :it:Grue (torrente), its counterpart in the Italian Wikipedia.
 

Rivers of Italy
Rivers of the Province of Alessandria